The 1953 Denver Pioneers football team was an American football team that represented the University of Denver as a member of the Skyline Conference during the 1953 college football season. In their first season under head coach Bob Blackman, the Pioneers compiled a 3–5–2 record (1–5–1 against conference opponents), tied for last place in the Skyline, and were outscored by a total of 195 to 159.

Schedule

References

Denver
Denver Pioneers football seasons
Denver Pioneers football